East Petersburg is a borough in Lancaster County, Pennsylvania, United States. The population was 4,591 at the 2020 census.

Geography
East Petersburg is located in north-central Lancaster County at  (40.100079, -76.352649). Pennsylvania Route 72 is the borough's Main Street, leading northwest  to Manheim and southeast the same distance to the center of Lancaster. Pennsylvania Route 722 (State Street) crosses Main Street in the center of town, and leads east  to Neffsville and southwest  to an interchange with the Pennsylvania Route 283 freeway.

Demographics

As of the census of 2000, there were 4,450 people, 1,708 households, and 1,327 families residing in the borough. The population density was 3,688.6 people per square mile (1,420.0/km2). There were 1,766 housing units at an average density of 1,463.8 per square mile (563.5/km2). The racial makeup of the borough was 95.03% White, 1.35% Black or African American, 0.16% Native American, 1.10% Asian, 0.07% Pacific Islander, 1.17% from other races, and 1.12% from two or more races. 2.85% of the population were Hispanic or Latino of any race.

There were 1,708 households, out of which 34.4% had children under the age of 18 living with them, 64.5% were married couples living together, 9.5% had a female householder with no husband present, and 22.3% were non-families. 18.5% of all households were made up of individuals, and 6.4% had someone living alone who was 65 years of age or older. The average household size was 2.60 and the average family size was 2.95.

In the borough the population was spread out, with 25.1% under the age of 18, 6.2% from 18 to 24, 29.9% from 25 to 44, 25.2% from 45 to 64, and 13.6% who were 65 years of age or older. The median age was 38 years. For every 100 females there were 95.6 males. For every 100 females age 18 and over, there were 89.2 males.

The median income for a household in the borough was $52,222, and the median income for a family was $53,910. Males had a median income of $38,700 versus $25,455 for females. The per capita income for the borough was $21,979. About 2.0% of families and 2.7% of the population were below the poverty line, including 4.9% of those under age 18 and 3.3% of those age 65 or over.

Schools
Schools in East Petersburg are part of the Hempfield School District. Children are served by the following schools within the district:

Elementary
 East Petersburg Elementary

Middle school
 Centerville Middle School

High school
 Hempfield High School

Government 

East Petersburg is governed by a seven-person borough council and mayor. As of January 2018 the council president was Cappy Panus and the mayor was James Andrew Malone.

East Petersburg Borough Council members are elected to four-year staggered terms. The borough council elects from members a president of council and a vice-president. The borough council serves as the legislative body elected by citizens of the borough. It is responsible for establishing policies, enacting by ordinance or resolution laws and regulations to implement approved policies, providing for annual budgets and appropriations of funds for lawful expenditures, appointing members to boards, and commissions established by the borough council. The mayor is responsible for law enforcement and holds a non-voting membership in the council, but with tie-breaking and veto powers per the Pennsylvania Borough Code.

The borough council meets twice per month to conduct business - a formal meeting the first Tuesday and a business meeting the third Thursday.

Community 

East Petersburg Day is celebrated annually in September with a parade and community festivities in East Petersburg Community Park. East Petersburg Swimming Pool, which is operated by the Hempfield Area Recreation Commission, is home to the East Petersburg Swim Team. The Penn Legacy Soccer Club operates several playing fields within the borough. The East Petersburg Historical Society and East Petersburg Sportman Association are also located within the borough.

Churches 
There are six churches within the borough:

 East Petersburg Mennonite Church 
 Zion Evangelical Lutheran Church
 Trinity United Church of Christ
 Grace Evangelical Congregational
 Real Life Church of God
 Open Door Mission Pentecostal

East Petersburg Churches is a community resource website from the pastors and churches in the borough.

Notable people
Christian Strenge, fraktur artist

References

External links

Populated places established in 1812
Boroughs in Lancaster County, Pennsylvania
1812 establishments in Pennsylvania